Quercus greggi, otherwise known as the Mexican oak, is a monoecious semi-evergreen oak that is adapted to survive in arid conditions.

The leaves are generally covered in a dense layer of trichomes. The bark is scale-like and light gray; it is covered in small lenticels, allowing the plants to undergo gas exchange with the surrounding atmosphere. The twigs of the plant are covered in thick woolly hairs.

Around April, the trees produce catkins that can have approximately 18 flowers are around 3–4.5 cm long. As the plants are monoecious (producing male and female cones on the same plant), they also produce female inflorescences. The female inflorescence generally grow around 2–4 flowers and are covered in trichomes, like the leaves of the plants. Like many more commonly known oaks, Mexican oaks utilize their male and female reproductive structures to produce the acorn nuts of the plant, which can appear alone or in clusters on small peduncles stemming from the main branches. The acorns contain a seed and eventually fall from the tree to start the growth of a new Mexican oak.

La Siberia is a cultivar of this species.

References

greggii
Endemic oaks of Mexico
Flora of the Sierra Madre Oriental
Flora of the Sierra Madre de Oaxaca
Taxa named by William Trelease